Noriaki (written: , , , , , , , , ,  or ) is a masculine Japanese given name. Notable people with the name include:

, Japanese footballer
, Japanese footballer
, Japanese botanist
, Japanese weightlifter
, Japanese aikidoka
, Japanese footballer
, Japanese educator
, Japanese ski jumper
, Japanese player of American football
Noriaki Kumagai (born 1970), Japanese drummer
, Japanese architect
, Japanese footballer
, Japanese voice actor and narrator
, Japanese film director
, Japanese footballer
, Japanese pole vaulter
, Japanese photographer
, Japanese film director

Fictional characters
, a character in the manga series JoJo's Bizarre Adventure

Japanese masculine given names